Dario Vujičević (born 1 April 1990) is a Croatian retired professional footballer who played as a midfielder. Raised in Germany, he also holds German citizenship.

Club career

Early life
Vujičević was born in Sarajevo, then still part of SFR Yugoslavia, his family later fled to Gronau, Germany and close to the Dutch border, to escape the Bosnian War.

Netherlands
After coming through the FC Twente youth system, he was promoted to their senior side in 2009. He was loaned to VVV-Venlo in January 2011.
After joining Dutch side Heracles Almelo in summer 2012, Vujičević was plagued by injuries, being out of the team for long periods. In February 2017, he agreed to be released from his contract from 1 March.

References

External links
 
 Voetbal International profile 

1990 births
Living people
Footballers from Sarajevo
Croats of Bosnia and Herzegovina
Association football midfielders
Croatian footballers
Croatia under-21 international footballers
FC Twente players
VVV-Venlo players
Heracles Almelo players
Eredivisie players
Oberliga (football) players
Croatian expatriate footballers
Expatriate footballers in the Netherlands
Croatian expatriate sportspeople in the Netherlands
Yugoslav Wars refugees
FC Eintracht Rheine players